James Henry Metcalfe (January 8, 1848 – January 1, 1925) was a Canadian businessman and political figure. He represented Kingston in the Legislative Assembly of Ontario from 1879 to 1892 and Kingston in the House of Commons of Canada from 1892 to 1896 as a Conservative member.

He was born in Kingston, Canada West in 1848, the son of John Metcalfe, who came to Kingston from Yorkshire, England. In 1869, he married Margaret Jane Clute. Metcalfe was a public school teacher in Kingston and later became an auctioneer. He served six years on the Kingston city council. Metcalfe resigned his seat in the provincial assembly in 1892 after being elected to the federal parliament. He ran unsuccessfully for the federal seat in 1902. Metcalfe served as Dominion Commissioner of Immigration for the North-West Territories and was warden of the Kingston Penitentiary from 1896 to 1899.

External links 

The Canadian parliamentary companion, 1885 JA Gemmill

1848 births
1925 deaths
Businesspeople from Ontario
Conservative Party of Canada (1867–1942) MPs
Members of the House of Commons of Canada from Ontario
People from Kingston, Ontario
Progressive Conservative Party of Ontario MPPs